The Ford Falcon (XP) is a mid-sized car produced by Ford Australia from 1965 to 1966. It was the fourth and last iteration of the first generation of the Falcon, and also included the Ford Fairmont (XP), the luxury-oriented version.

Introduction
The XP Falcon was introduced in March 1965, replacing the XM Falcon which had been in production since 1964. It was the final series of the first-generation Falcon which had been introduced as the XK Falcon in 1960. The main change from the XM was the 'torque box' steel subframe which added structural rigidity to the car. This was a key in improving the public perception of the car, as the early models were considered flimsy and were unpopular with Australian fleet buyers.

The running gear and most other components stayed the same from the XM through to the XP. All of the utility, sedan delivery, and taxi/police kit vehicles had five-lug 13-inch wheels and larger 10-inch drum brakes, as had all previous commercial models. Commercials had always had lower-ratio differentials (4.00:1) and larger 6.70 x 13 tyres.

The high-end Fairmonts, which were released by Ford Australia as a means of competing with Holdens Premier came with 14-inch four-lug wheels to accommodate the standard disc brakes on this model, whereas other models had 13-inch wheels if disc brakes were not optioned. Both Fairmonts and Futuras (including Futura hardtops) featured bucket seats, however only the Futura models had a center console,

The 200 ci Super Pursuit engine initially in four-main bearing form and finally with the imported seven-main bearing unit, three-speed automatic transmission, and a padded dash along with carpets, perforated, colour-matched headlining, blower heater, screen washers, chrome-plated interior mirror, seven interior door-operated lights, and a handbrake on warning light flasher as standard. Vacuum-assisted disc brakes were standard in the Fairmont only and optional on other sedan and hardtop models.

The XP Falcon shared the same front panels (bonnet and front guards) as the 1960-63 Mercury Comet.

Model range
The XP Falcon passenger car range was initially offered in four-door sedan, two-door hardtop, and five-door station wagon body styles marketed as:
 Falcon Standard Sedan
 Falcon Standard Wagon
 Falcon Deluxe Sedan
 Falcon Deluxe Hardtop
 Falcon Deluxe Wagon
 Falcon Futura Sedan
 Falcon Futura Hardtop
 Falcon Squire Wagon

In September 1965, the Falcon Futura Sedan and Falcon Squire Wagon were replaced by two new Fairmont models marketed as:
 Fairmont Sedan
 Fairmont Wagon

The XP Falcon commercial vehicles range was offered in two-door coupe utility and two-door panel van body styles marketed as:
 Falcon Standard Utility
 Falcon Deluxe Utility
 Falcon Sedan Delivery

Production and replacement
Production of the XP Falcon range totaled 70,998 vehicles prior to its replacement by the XR Falcon in September 1966. A total of 93 XP Falcon Squire wagons were produced between February and August 1965.

References

External links
 XP Falcon

XP
Cars of Australia
Cars introduced in 1965
Cars discontinued in 1966
XP Falcon
Sedans
Station wagons
Coupé utilities
Vans
Rear-wheel-drive vehicles